Goose Pond is a pond in the U.S. state of Washington. 

Goose Pond was named for the geese which congregate there.

References

Lakes of Thurston County, Washington